Docosia is a genus of fungus gnats in the family Mycetophilidae.

Selected species
 Docosia kerkini Kurina & Sevcik, 2011
 Docosia muranica Kurina & Sevcik, 2011
 Docosia rameli Kurina & Sevcik, 2011

References

Mycetophilidae
Bibionomorpha genera